Baguirmi or Bagirmi may refer to:

 Baguirmi Department
 Baguirmi language
 Baguirmi people
 Sultanate of Baguirmi